The Chudakarana or the Mundana, is the eighth of the sixteen Hindu saṃskāras (sacraments), in which a child receives their first haircut.

No reference is provided in any Grhya Sutras, but, in general this samskara is taken place at the end of first year or before the expiry of the third year, but the later authorities extend the age to the seventh year.  The child's hair is shorn, frequently leaving only the śikhā or cūḍā, a tuft at the crown of the head.

Originally, the arrangement of the śikhā was the most significant feature of the Chudakarana and the number of tufts was determined by the number of the pravaras belonging to the gotra of the child. Later, in northern India, keeping only one tuft became universal. But in the Deccan and southern India, earlier traditions remained alive to some extent.

In tradition, the hair from birth is associated with undesirable traits from past lives. Thus at the time of the mundana, the child is freshly shaven to signify freedom from the past and moving into the future. The rite is performed as a special ceremony in most homes, for young girls and boys.

At Rishikesh, on the banks of the Ganges, there is a special chudakarana or mundana samskara. In this ceremony, along with cutting and shaving hair, Vedic mantras and prayers are chanted by trained priests, acharyas and rishikumaras. The child's head is shaven and the hair is then symbolically offered to the holy river. The child and his/her family then perform a sacred yajna ceremony and the Ganga Aarti.

See also
 First haircut
 Sikha

References

Samskaras